9 Beet Stretch, by Scandinavian sound artist Leif Inge, is a piece of idea-based sound art made of Beethoven's Ninth Symphony. The source recording, a Naxos recording conducted by Béla Drahos with the Nicolaus Esterházy Sinfonia and Chorus (Naxos 8.553478), was stretched digitally to a duration of 24 hours with no distortion or pitch shifting. The work is presented as a 24-hour-long sound installation/electroacoustic concert.

History 
The initial realization of 9 Beet Stretch was done in 2002 at NOTAM (Norwegian network for Technology, Acoustics and Music) by Anders Vinjar, Kjetil Matheussen, Leif Inge, and Bjarne Kvinnesland. It was redone at NOTAM in 2004 by Leif Inge and Anders Vinjar, and the concert premiere took place from April 16 to 17, 2004, at Kupfer Ironworks, Madison, Wisconsin, under the production of Jeff Hunt of Table of the Elements. Among the venues it has been presented in include Wien Modern 06, Vienna; BizArt Art Center, Shanghai; Diapason Gallery, New York; The University of Alberta, Ultima International Festival of Contemporary Music, Oslo, 964 Natoma, San Francisco, and Concertgebouw Brugge, Bruges.

It is available online in a number of audio formats, including a 24-hours-a-day, 7-days-a-week web cast.

On 3 November 2009, Raudio.nl launched an iPhone App with the 9 Beet Stretch as the opening track.

Influence 
In response to Inge's creation, sound artist Ezra LaFleur created 2 Mall Stretch: a digitally stretched recording of Gustav Mahler's Second Symphony.

References

SoundBlog (Harold Schellinx) on 9 Beet Stretch
Los Angeles Times (Mark Swed) on 9 Beet Stretch
The Village Voice (Kyle Gann) on 9 Beet Stretch
The New York Times (Ben Sisario) on 9 Beet Stretch
ZDNetUK (Rupert Goodwins) on 9 Beet Stretch
Hugill, Andrew (2008). The digital musician. Taylor & Francis. p. 83.

External links 
9 Beet Stretch
2 Mall Stretch
Raudio Special :: 9 Beet Stretch
Raudio.nl/5 for blogs and links to the iPhone App with the 9 Beet Stretch as opening track

Electronic compositions